The Hemingway House and Barn is a historic summer estate at 3310 Old Missouri Road in Fayetteville, Arkansas.  The house is a two-story wood-frame gambrel-roofed structure, set in a landscape designed (as were the buildings) by Little Rock architect Charles L. Thompson.  The house and barn were built for Elwin Hemingway, a local lawyer.  The barn, located just southwest of the house, is believed to be the only architect-designed structure of its type in the state.

The property was listed on the National Register of Historic Places in 1982.

See also
National Register of Historic Places listings in Washington County, Arkansas

References

Houses on the National Register of Historic Places in Arkansas
Houses completed in 1907
Houses in Fayetteville, Arkansas
National Register of Historic Places in Fayetteville, Arkansas